Liam Allen (born in New Zealand) is a New Zealand rugby union player who plays for the  in Super Rugby. His playing position is lock or flanker. He joined the Crusaders during the Super Rugby Trans-Tasman competition as injury cover. He represented  in the 2020 Mitre 10 Cup joining the side as a replacement player ahead of round 8 and making two appearances.

Reference list

External links
itsrugby.co.uk profile

New Zealand rugby union players
Living people
Rugby union locks
Rugby union flankers
Year of birth missing (living people)
Canterbury rugby union players
Crusaders (rugby union) players